The Most Ancient and Most Noble Order of the Thistle was founded in 1687. Dates shown are for election or installation. Probably incomplete.

Seventeenth Century

Anne (1702–1714)

George I (1714–1727)

George II (1727–1760)

George III (1760–1820)

George IV (1820–1830)

William IV (1830–1837)

Victoria (1837–1901)

Edward VII (1901–1910)

George V (1910–1936)

Edward VIII did not make any appointments to the order during his brief reign.

George VI (1936–1952)

Elizabeth II (1952–2022)

See also
List of Knights and Ladies of the Garter
 List of Knights of St Patrick
List of Knights Grand Cross of the Order of the Bath
List of Knights and Dames Grand Cross of the Order of St Michael and St George
List of Knights Grand Cross of the Order of the British Empire

Knights and Ladies of the Thistle

Knights and Ladies of the Thistle
Thistle